Mikhail Anatolyevich Kerzhakov (born 28 January 1987) is a Russian professional footballer who plays as a goalkeeper for FC Zenit Saint Petersburg. He is the younger brother of striker Aleksandr Kerzhakov.

Club career
On 10 February 2017, he joined FC Orenburg on loan until the end of the 2016–17 season.

On 15 June 2022, Kerzhakov extended his contract with FC Zenit Saint Petersburg for the 2022–23 season.

International career
Kerzhakov was called up to the Russia national football team for the first time for a friendly against Kyrgyzstan in September 2022.

Career statistics

Notes

Honours
Zenit Saint Petersburg
Russian Premier League: 2007, 2018–19, 2019–20, 2020–21, 2021–22
Russian Cup: 2016, 2019–20
Russian Super Cup: 2015, 2016, 2020, 2021

References

External links
 Player profile at Official Zenit website

1987 births
People from Kingisepp
Living people
Russian footballers
Russia youth international footballers
Russia under-21 international footballers
Association football goalkeepers
Russian Premier League players
Russian First League players
FC Spartak Vladikavkaz players
FC Volgar Astrakhan players
FC Volga Nizhny Novgorod players
FC Anzhi Makhachkala players
FC Zenit Saint Petersburg players
FC Orenburg players
FC Zenit-2 Saint Petersburg players
FC Sportakademklub Moscow players
FC Volga Ulyanovsk players
Sportspeople from Leningrad Oblast